Aimee Ellen Willard (June 8, 1974 – June 20, 1996) was a college lacrosse player who was murdered by Arthur Bomar near Philadelphia on her way home from a night out with friends. Her car was left running, with the lights on and driver's side door open, on the Exit 5 off-ramp of Interstate 476. Her body was found the next day in North Philadelphia, 17 miles away. She had been beaten to death with a tire iron. The beating was so savage that her skull had multiple fractures. The then-unsolved crime was featured on Unsolved Mysteries and later as a solved one on Cold Case Files and The New Detectives. The story of her murder and investigation was also featured on an episode of Forensic Files as well as in the film The Dark Side of Parole.

Investigation and suspect
The case went cold for nearly two years when many theories and suspects were investigated. The case was re-opened when another woman in Pennsylvania was hit from behind while driving alone at night. The other vehicle's driver tried to get her to stop, but the woman refused and instead memorized his license plate number. That plate was registered to Arthur Bomar, but the car belonged to Maria Cabuenos, another Pennsylvania woman who had been reported missing in March 1998. Bomar's actual car was later found at a junkyard. The burn pattern found on Willard's back was consistent with the oil pan on the bottom of Bomar's car. Moreover, Willard's blood and hair were found in Bomar’s car.

With DNA evidence, Arthur Bomar was identified as Willard's killer. He was an ex-convict convicted of second-degree murder in 1979 in Nevada; he was paroled 11 years later. Bomar had repeatedly violated his parole but was never returned to Nevada to finish his sentence, due to that state's failure to arrange and finance extradition.

Bomar was convicted of first-degree murder, rape, assault, kidnapping, and abuse of a corpse and was sentenced to death.  He was never charged with the murder of Maria Cabuenos, whose skeletal remains were found after his conviction. It is theorized that on the night of her murder, Bomar hit Willard's car in order to force her to pull over. Bomar, to this day, denies any role in the crimes, claiming he was a target of racism.

Life and legacy
Willard was a star lacrosse player at the Academy of Notre Dame de Namur in Villanova, Pennsylvania, and later at George Mason University from 1994 to 1996 (the first three seasons in program history). In 1996, Willard led the Colonial Athletic Association in scoring fifty goals and twenty-nine assists in lacrosse. She was named to the All-Conference Team in both soccer and lacrosse, and to the All-American team for the Southeast region in lacrosse that year. In total, she scored 96 goals and recorded 36 assists for the lacrosse team. At the end of the 1996 season (her third), she held the school records for most goals in a game (7), most goals in a season (50), career goals, most points in a game (8), most points in a season (68), and most career points (132). US Lacrosse has created a national award in her honor.

Because of the bureaucratic issues which allowed Bomar to remain free to commit these crimes, The Victims of Trafficking and Violence Protection Act (H.R. 3244), better known as "Aimee's Law," was passed by the US Congress by a vote of 90–5 in 2000 and signed into law by President Bill Clinton on October 28, 2000. It encourages states to keep murderers, rapists, and child molesters behind bars and holds the state financially accountable if it fails. It allows interstate parole violators to be jailed in their state of residence at the expense of the state where the original offense was committed. It allows offenders to be jailed in another state if circumstances allow.

A small roadside memorial on the exit ramp from Interstate 476 to southbound U.S. Route 1 marks the site where Willard's car was found.

References

External links
Aimee Willard's HomePage 
Forensic Files – Season 7, Ep 20: Telltale Tracks
AIMEE’S LAW Signed Into Federal Law (October 2000)
Gail Willard Testimony Before The Crime Sub-Committee  "Aimee's Law"
COMMONWEALTH V. BOMAR, Appeal of 2014 Denied at findlaw.com

1974 births
1996 deaths
Lacrosse players from Pennsylvania
Murdered American students
Place of birth missing
People murdered in Pennsylvania
George Mason Patriots women's lacrosse players
20th-century American women
Sportspeople from Philadelphia
American women's soccer players
Women's association football defenders
Soccer players from Pennsylvania
George Mason Patriots women's soccer players
20th-century American people
History of women in Pennsylvania
Deaths by beating in the United States